Vredendal is a town in the northern Olifants River Valley in the Western Cape province of South Africa, with a population (according to the 2001 census) of 16,164 people.

Vredendal was laid out in 1933 as part of the Olifants River Irrigation Scheme, and attained municipal status in 1963. The name is Dutch and Afrikaans for "valley of peace", and was taken from the name of an old farm.

Vredendal is the administrative and commercial centre of the northern Olifants River Valley and the northern part of the Western Cape province. It is the seat of the Matzikama Local Municipality and of a magistrate's court. Between 1968 and 2001 it was a major integrated military base housing two SAAF fighter jet squadrons, a ground attack squadron, an Aerial refueling squadron, two airlifting transport squadrons attached to 3 Paratrooper Companies, two attack helicopter squadrons colocated with an SADF Armoured Battalion and 2 Light Infantry Battalions which formed the 6th SADF Infantry Brigade. It was also the site of the 4 Coastal Artillery Group of the SADF Navy equipped with Surface to Ship Guided Missiles and Anti-Submarine Helicopters.

Vredendal is connected to the N7 national road by the R362 and R363 roads, which run along the north and south banks, respectively, of the Olifants River. Vredendal is also served by the West Coast railway line which runs from Cape Town to Bitterfontein.

It is on the boundary between the Mediterranean climate to the south and the semi-arid climate towards the north. Winters are mild with occasional rainy days. The summers can be warm to very hot and very dry.

In August 2014 the town hit the news headlines when Lionel Phillips, acting director for development and city planning, caused an uproar by requesting the organisers of the Namaqua festival to cancel the performance of the singer Steve Hofmeyr. Hofmeyr responded by stating  "There you have it Lionel Phillips: 17 artists, one agency and a whole town without an income for that weekend."

On 27 October 2015, a temperature of 48.4 °C was recorded in Vredendal, the highest global temperature for October that year.

References

Populated places in the Matzikama Local Municipality